Anzia centrifuga is a species of foliose lichen in the family Parmeliaceae. It is found only on one volcano on Porto Santo in the Madeira Archipelago, where it grows on rocks.

Taxonomy
The lichen was described as a new discovered species in 1992 by Norwegian lichenologist Reidar Haugan. The type specimen was collected from Pico do Castelo on Porto Santo (Madeira Archipelago, Portugal). The chondroid axis of the medulla indicate a placement in section Nervosae in genus Anzia.

Description
The lobes comprising the thallus are 1–2 mm wide and dichotomously branched. The lobes tend to become broader and rounded at the tips, which may also be pruinose from crystals of calcium oxalate. The thallus underside has a spongy layer (spongiostratum) that is hardly visible from the top. It is often grazed by snails or arthropods. Scattered black rhizines can develop from the chondroid axis of the medulla. Apothecia are quite common in this species. Asci contain numerous crescent-shaped ascospores with dimensions of 9–15 by 2–4 μm.

Secondary chemicals present in Anzia centrifuga include atranorin, divaricatic acid, and terpenoids.

Habitat and distribution
Anzia centrifuga grows on dry, sun-exposed rock – the only member of the genus with this habitat preference. It is known only from a few localities on Pico do Castelo. Associated lichens include Ramalina species and Heterodermia leucomelos. Because of its estimated small population, restricted distribution, and potential threats such as accidental extinction from tourism, fire, trampling, and grazing, in 2014 it was assessed as a vulnerable species on the IUCN Red List of Threatened Species. A 2017 study estimated its population to be 50–100 individuals, with a suitable potential habitat of less than one square kilometre.

References

Parmeliaceae
Lichen species
Lichens described in 1992
Lichens of Macaronesia